Knut Hjalmar Stolpe (23 April 1841 – 27 January 1905), was a Swedish entomologist, archaeologist, and ethnographer. He was the first director and curator of the Museum of Ethnography, Sweden. He is best known for his meticulous archaeological excavations at the Viking-age site Birka on the island Björkö.

Biography
Hjalmar Stolpe was born at Gävle in Gävleborg County, Sweden. He was the son of Carl Johan Stolpe, the mayor of Norrköping, and Katarina Vilhelmina Charlotta Eckhoff.

He graduated from Uppsala University in 1860 with a degree in zoology and botany and obtained a PhD in 1872. He worked at the Swedish History Museum during the years 1874–1900. Over a period of twenty years, he carried out large excavations at Birka on Björkö where there are burial mounds dating from the Bronze Age. One of the graves he documented was that of the Birka female Viking warrior (Birka chamber grave Bj 581) buried with the accoutrements of an elite professional Viking warrior in a 10th-century chamber-grave.

In 1883–1885 he took part in the Vanadis expedition which sailed around the world with the frigate Vanadis visiting South America, Oceania, Asia, and Europe. During land excursions, Stolpe collected 7500 cultural specimens for an intended ethnographical museum in Sweden. In 1900, an ethnographic department was established at Swedish Museum of Natural History (now the Museum of Ethnography, Sweden (Etnografiska museet). Hjalmar Stolpe became the ethnographic unit's first director. In 1903 he was appointed curator and professor.

Personal life
From 1875 he was married to Emmy Holmgren (1841 - 1905).
He died in 1905 in Stockholm.

Gallery

Publications
  
  (French edition of )

References

Other sources
Erikson, Bo G. (2015)  Kungen av Birka: Hjalmar Stolpe arkeolog och etnograf. Andra upplagan (Stockholm: Atlantis)  
Erikson, Bo G. (2020) Expedition Vanadis : en etnografisk världsomsegling 1883-1885 (Stockholm:  Bokförlaget Stolpe)

Related reading

Harrison, Dick; Kristina Svensson (2007) Vikingaliv (Stockholm : Natur och Kultur)

External links
Etnografiska museet website

1841 births
1905 deaths
Swedish archaeologists
Swedish entomologists
Swedish ethnographers
People from Gävle
Uppsala University alumni